Santo Niño de Tondo Parish, also known as Tondo Church, is a Roman Catholic church in Tondo, Manila established by the Augustinians. It houses an image of the Infant Jesus which originally came from Acapulco, Mexico and was handed over by a wealthy  merchant to the Archbishop of Manila at that time, who later turned it over to the parish priest of Tondo, Manila. Since 1572, the image of the Santo Niño has been enshrined in this church.

Church history 
The church, one of the earliest churches established by the Spanish friars in Luzon,  was founded by the Augustinians who were the first order to arrive in the Philippines. The Augustinian Convent in Tondo was approved by the provincial chapter on May 3, 1572. Its visitas were Lubao, Betis and Calumpit. Fray Alonzo Alvarado, OSA was the first Augustinian religious to direct the church. In 1572, Tondo Church added visitas in northern suburbs, including Malolos. Through Fray Diego Ordoñez de Vivar, Tondo extended its ecclesiastical territory to Morong.

Construction of the first stone monastery is believed to have started in 1611 under Fray Alonso Guerrero, then minister of Tondo. The convent of Tondo was relieved of its ten percent contribution (tithe) to Manila in 1620 due to the needed costly repairs of the convent and the church. This resolution was repeated the following year due to needed assistance to be provided for the father provincial who was then staying in Tondo.

During 1625, Fray Antonio de Ocampo pawned  the convent for 800 pesos, the sum to be spent during a three-year term improvement of the house facilities like the cenador, staircase, etc. It is believed that the construction of the church and convent was finalized at around this time.

In 1641, the prior was authorized to repair the church due to the turmoil caused by the Sangleys and in addition, water cisterns were installed to save budget for purchasing. Four years after, the church was in need of immediate repair because it was devastated again by the 1645 Luzon earthquake. The repairs and restoration were done and the "church looked magnificent and strong in its full masonry construction."

This magnificence was short-lived because, in 1661, Governor Sabiniano Manrique de Lara who feared Koseng (Koxinga), a Chinese pirate from Hermosa Island (Formosa, now Taiwan) might fortify himself inside the structure. He ordered that the structure be pulled down. According to a clause of the Chapter of 1661, "the convent suffered so much during the war of the Sangleys that now it cannot be sufficient by itself." The income of Sangley stores, the alms for the souls in purgatory, some donations and tax exemption were utilized for the rebuilding of the church and the convent.

In 1714, the Private Definitory proposed that the church and convent of Tondo pay back from their own properties the funds that were spent for the reconstructions of the church. In 1728, the convent used 2,000 pesos from the provincial funds to renovate and enlarge the church. The facade and the two towers that were about to fall were reconstructed in 1734. This rebuilding was done during the term of Fr. Diego Bergaño. The building was damaged again by the earthquake of 1740 and was repaired the next year.

The church was heavily damaged again by another earthquake in 1863 and was rebuilt for the third time by Fr. Manuel Diez Gonzalez. The restoration was completed by Fr. Casimiro Herrero, parish priest of Tondo from 1874 to 1880, who followed the plans of Architect Luciano Oliver in 1873. For the first time in the country, steel framing was used for the media naranja dome and iron sheets for the roofing. Condrado Gregorio took over the construction from Architect Oliver and used aramadura de hierro, which came from England. Fr. Mariano Gil led the construction of the cemetery during his priorship from 1889 to 1898. The fence was designed by Architect Gregorio N. Santos. Walls made of stone were imported from Guadalupe and Meycauayan. The entire construction project costed 2,150 pesos.

The organ was imported from the renowned Amezua Organeros of Barcelona, Spain and was installed in 1893. It had one main keyboard with 56 keys and a peladier with 19 keys and four combinations. In 1898, Fr. Pablo Alvarez bought a molave door for 1470 pesos to be used as the main entrance door.

Church services came to a halt when it was used as a cuartel during the Japanese occupation of the Philippines. The services were held in the house of Primo Arambulo at Santiago de Vera Street. During the last days of the Japanese occupation, the church was reopened for thousands of refugees.

In 1997, aside from major repairs, Carillon bells were installed under the term of Msgr. Emmanuel Sunga as Parish Priest.

Architectural style 

The structural envelope is characterized by minimal ornamentation with Ionic rectangular pilasters attached at the main facade. Massive buttresses also support the unproportional domes of the bell towers. There are also blind arched openings that contrast with the rectangular voids and a triangular pediment. The neoclassical architectural style has its big influence the construction of the church and convent. In its interiors, It is composed of a main central nave that is flanked by two aisles that are linked by solid columns. The internal space spans 65 meters in length, 22 meters in width and 17 meters in height.

Feast Day of Sto. Niño de Tondo

The feast day of Sto. Niño in Tondo is celebrated in the third Sunday of January. The fiesta in Tondo has the biggest participation in Manila, not only because Tondo is the most populous district in the city and poorest but perhaps because of the many anecdotes connected with the Sto. Niño of Tondo. 

According to the Philippine Historical Commission, the people of Tondo celebrated the feast day with a fluvial procession that “attracted thousands of visitors.” Tondo's terrain at that time consisted of waterways and tributaries which were connected to Manila Bay, a probable reason why the present stone church of Tondo was constructed on elevated ground (several meters above sea level) to prevent sea waters from inundating the Church.

Nick Joaquin, in his book entitled Almanac for Manileños (Published in 1979) describes the previous celebrations of the fiesta:

Gallery

References

Roman Catholic churches in Manila
Buildings and structures in Tondo, Manila
Cultural Properties of the Philippines in Metro Manila
Churches in the Roman Catholic Archdiocese of Manila